The Tone Aqueduct, near Nynehead, Somerset, was built in 1828 and is now disused. It formerly carried the Grand Western Canal over the River Tone.

Description 
Built by James Green about 1828, this aqueduct comprises a cast iron trough supported by a single-span stone arch. It is now registered by Historic England as a Grade II listed building.

References

External links 

Bridges completed in 1828
Grade II listed bridges
Grade II listed buildings in Taunton Deane
Works of James Green
Grand Western Canal
Cast iron aqueducts